Red Lions Football Club is a Malawian football (soccer) club based in Zomba, Southern Region and currently playing in the TNM Super League, the top division of Malawian football.

History

The Red Lions FC   is a military football club from Zomba, the old capital of Malawi. In the past the club was predominantly made of soldiers. Most of their players were spotted from smaller military teams back in the days in the name of Moyale Barracks FC, Kamuzu Barracks FC and the Kamuzu Military College now MAFCO. In recent years all these teams have been promoted to play in the TNM Super League, the highest football league in the country, thus the Red Lions Football Club have to acquire talent from elsewhere. 

The club has produced notable footballers some of which were instrumental in the success of the Malawi national football team such as Collins Thewe, Matthias Chisale, Wilfred Nyalugwe, Mike Kumanga, Prichard Mwansa and Victor Phiri among others. The club has never been relegated since the inception of the Super League in Malawi. Even though its currently base is in the Eastern Town of Balaka, the club hails from Zomba City.

Current squad

References

External links
Tag archives - Nyasatimes.com

Football clubs in Malawi
2010 establishments in Malawi
Military association football clubs in Malawi